= That They May Win =

That They May Win was a play by Arthur Miller. It was first published in the book Best One Act Plays of 1944 (New York: Dodd Mead, 1945).
